Vanjie: 24 Hours of Love is an American reality competition television series premiered on WOW Presents Plus. It is the streaming service's first unscripted reality original programming. The series sees Vanessa Vanjie Mateo selecting a suitor from 18 bachelors within 24 hours, at the Vansion. Guest appearances have been made by Derrick Barry, Gottmik, and Violet Chachki.

Contestants 
Ages, names, and cities stated are at the time of filming.

Notes:

Episodes

References 

2020s American reality television series
2020s LGBT-related reality television series
American LGBT-related reality television series
WOW Presents Plus original programming
2020s American LGBT-related television series
Drag (clothing) television shows